Poliopastea nordina is a moth in the subfamily Arctiinae. It was described by Schaus in 1901. It is found in Mexico.

References

Moths described in 1901
Euchromiina